Raphitoma cordieri is a species of sea snail, a marine gastropod mollusk in the family Raphitomidae.

Subspecies
 Raphitoma cordieri hirta Monterosato
 Raphitoma cordieri hispida Monterosato

Description
The length of the shell varies between 12 mm and 20 mm.

The turreted shell is easily recognized by its ribs which, like the transverse striations, are elevated and somewhat lamellous. The color is either black or brown, mixed with white or entirely pink. The seven whorls are convex. The outer lip is wrinkled. The transverse striations extend as far as the columella. The siphonal canal is short and straight.

Distribution
This species occurs in the Mediterranean Sea and off Senegal

References

 Gofas, S.; Le Renard, J.; Bouchet, P. (2001). Mollusca. in: Costello, M.J. et al. (eds), European Register of Marine Species: a check-list of the marine species in Europe and a bibliography of guides to their identification. Patrimoines Naturels. 50: 180-213

External links
 
 Locard A. (1886). Prodrome de malacologie française. Catalogue général des mollusques vivants de France. Mollusque marins. Lyon, H. Georg & Paris, Baillière : pp. X + 778
  Blainville H. M. (D. de) (1828-1830). Malacozoaires ou Animaux Mollusques. [in Faune Française. Levrault, Paris 320 p., 48 pl. [livr. 18 (1828), p. 1-80; livr. 2 (1829), p. 81-176; livr. 23 (1829), p. 177-240; livr. 28 (1830), p. 241-320]
 Natural History Museum, Rotterdam: Raphitoma cordieri

cordieri
Gastropods described in 1826